Holywell is a parish in Oxford, England. The toponym is derived from the well of Saint Winifred and Saint Margaret.

See also
 St Cross Church, Oxford
 Holywell Cemetery
 Holywell Manor
 Holywell Music Room
 Holywell Street

References

Further reading
 

Areas of Oxford